Little Wallachia or Little Vlachia, or Lesser Wallachia or Lesser Vlachia, may refer to places inhabited by Romanians or Aromanians, derived from the exonym Vlach:

 An area, also known as Lesser Wallachia, in what is now Oltenia, Romania
 An alternate name used in the 15th-18th century for Moldavia 
 A medieval name for the areas of Aromanian settlement in Aetolia-Acarnania, Greece
 An area in what is now central Croatia registered during Austrians and Turks wars.